Payap Premchai; is a retired Thai Muay Thai fighter.

Biography and career
Payap started training in Muay Thai at the age of 14 and had about 40 fights in various provinces before making his debut at the Lumpinee Stadium in 1975. 

In the late 1970s Payap emerged as a top fighter of the Bangkok circuit with an incredibly powerful left kick. in 1979 he defeated a first legend in Pudpadnoi Worawut, he then became the most dominant fighter of Thailand in the higher weights in the early 1980s. During his career he captured the Rajadamnern Stadium 147 lbs in 1986 and defeated notable fighters of his era such as Sagat Petchyindee, Lakchart Sor.Prasatporn, Posai Sitiboonlert, Somsong Kiathoranee, Krongsak Sakkasem or Samart Prasarnmit. 

On November 28, 1981 Payap faced Tetsuya Sakiyama at a WKA event in Hong Kong. The back and forth battle was judged a draw after five rounds.

On January 12, 1984 Payap faced reigning WKA World champion Rob Kaman in Amsterdam, Netherlands. He lost the fight by decision.

On August 8, 1986 Payap took part in a 4-man tournament for the Queen's Birthday event at Samrong stadium. In semifinal he defeated Khunpolnoi Sor.Thanongsak by decision and during the final he stopped Lakchart Sor.Prasatporn with kicks to the arms in the second round.

On November 24 1986 Payap faced rival Tesuya Sakiyama for the fifth ad last time at a MAJKF in Tokyo, Japan. He won the fight by majority decision.

On August 13, 1988 Payap traveled to Japan to face the reigning Shootboxing champion Takeshi Caesar at UWF "The Professional Bout". He lost the fight by knockout due to a middle kick in the first round.

Titles and accomplishments
Rajadamnern Stadium
 1986 Rajadamnern Stadium Welterweight (147 lbs) Champion

Muay Thai record

|-  style="text-align:center; background:#fbb;"
| ? || Loss ||align=left| David Ismalone || Rajadamnern Stadium|| Bangkok, Thailand || Decision || 5 || 3:00
|-
! style=background:white colspan=9 |

|-  style="text-align:center; background:#fbb;"
|1988-08-13 || Loss ||align=left| Takeshi Caesar || UWF "The Professional Bout" || Tokyo, Japan || KO (Body kick) || 1 || 2:36

|-  bgcolor="#fbb"
| 1988- || Loss ||align=left| Changpuek Kiatsongrit || Lumpinee Stadium || Bangkok, Thailand || KO (Low kicks) || 1 || 

|-  style="background:#fbb;"
| 1987- || Loss||align=left| Krongsak Sakkasem ||  ||Sakhon Nakhon, Thailand || Ref. stop. (lack of combativity) || 4 ||

|-  style="background:#cfc;"
| 1987- || Win ||align=left| Samart Prasarnmit ||  || Thailand || Decision|| 5||3:00 

|-  bgcolor="#fbb"
| 1987-05-31 || Loss ||align=left| Rob Kaman ||  || Amsterdam, Netherlands || KO (Left hook to the body) || 5 || 

|-  style="background:#fbb;"
| 1987-04-24 || Loss ||align=left| Changpuek Kiatsongrit || Rangsit Stadium || Bangkok, Thailand || DQ (threw a kick)|| 4 || 
|-
! style=background:white colspan=9 |

|-  style="background:#cfc;"
| 1987- || Win ||align=left| Samart Prasarnmit ||  || Thailand || Decision|| 5||3:00 

|-  style="background:#cfc;"
| 1986-11-24 || Win ||align=left| Tetsuya Sakiyama || MAJKF "Samurai-tachi no Utage"|| Tokyo, Japan || Decision (Majority)|| 5||3:00

|-  style="background:#cfc;"
| 1986-08-08 || Win ||align=left| Lakchart Sor.Prasartporn || Queen’s Birthday, Rangsit Stadium Tournament Final  ||Rangsit, Thailand || TKO (arm injury/kicks)|| 2 || 

|-  style="background:#cfc;"
| 1986-08-08 || Win ||align=left| Khunpolnoi Sor.Thanongsak || Queen’s Birthday, Rangsit Stadium Tournament Semi Final  ||Rangsit, Thailand || Decision || 3 || 3:00

|-  style="background:#fbb;"
| 1986- || Loss ||align=left| Samart Prasarnmit || Rangsit Stadium || Thailand || Decision|| 5||3:00 

|-  style="background:#cfc;"
| 1986-05-23  || Win ||align=left| Lakchart Sor.Prasartporn Ekaphon Songdej || 2 vs 1 Samrong Stadium  ||Samut Prakan, Thailand || Decision || 6 ||3:00
|-
! style=background:white colspan=9 |
|-  style="background:#cfc;"
| 1986- || Win ||align=left| Krongsak Sakkasem ||  ||Si Saket, Thailand || Ref. stop. (lack of combativity) || 3 ||

|-  style="background:#cfc;"
| 1986- || Win ||align=left| Lakchart Sor.Prasartporn|| Samrong Stadium  ||Samut Prakan, Thailand || Decision || 5 || 3:00
|-
! style=background:white colspan=9 |

|-  style="background:#cfc;"
| 1986- || Win ||align=left| Saensatharn Saengrit || Rangsit Stadium  ||Rangsit, Thailand || TKO (arm injury/Kicks) || 4 ||

|-  style="background:#fbb;"
| 1985-11- || Loss ||align=left| Samart Prasarnmit ||  || Thailand || Decision|| 5||3:00 

|-  style="background:#cfc;"
| 1985-08-08 || Win ||align=left| Fahdaeng Sor.Service || Rajadamnern Stadium || Bangkok, Thailand || TKO || 5 || 

|-  style="background:#cfc;"
| 1984-10-18 || Win ||align=left| Fahdaeng Sor.Service || Khon Kaen Boxing Stadium || Khon Kaen province, Thailand || Decision || 5 || 3:00

|-  style="background:#cfc;"
| 1984-09-26 || Win ||align=left| Ekaphon Songdej || Rajadamnern Stadium || Bangkok, Thailand || Decision || 5 || 3:00

|-  style="background:#cfc;"
| 1984- || Win ||align=left| Robert Davis || WKA || Hong Kong || Decision || 5 || 3:00

|-  bgcolor="#fbb"
| 1984-01-12 || Loss ||align=left| Rob Kaman ||  || Amsterdam, Netherlands || Decision (Unanimous) || 5 || 3:00

|-  style="background:#cfc;"
| 1983-09-23 || Win ||align=left| Peter Van Os || || Netherlands || TKO (Middle kicks) || 3 ||

|-  style="background:#cfc;"
| 1983-04-24 || Win ||align=left| Tetsuya Sakiyama ||  || Bangkok, Thailand || KO || 3 ||

|-  style="background:#cfc;"
| 1982-07-31 || Win ||align=left| Tetsuya Sakiyama || WKA, Queen Elizabeth Stadium || Hong Kong || KO (High kick)|| 5||

|-  style="background:#cfc;"
| 1982-01-03 || Win ||align=left| Michael Spink || International Free-style Kickboxing Championship || Hong Kong || Decision || 3 || 3:00

|-  style="background:#cfc;"
| 1982- || Win ||align=left| Somsong Kiathoranee ||  || Phrae province, Thailand || Decision || 5 || 3:00

|-  style="background:#cfc;"
| 1982-02-09 || Win||align=left| Tetsuya Sakiyama || WKA, Queen Elizabeth Stadium || Hong Kong || TKO (Doctor stoppage/cut)|| 2 || 

|-  style="background:#cfc;"
| 1981-12-04 || Win ||align=left| Somsong Kiathoranee ||  || Thailand || Decision || 5 || 3:00

|-  style="background:#c5d2ea;"
| 1981-11-28 || Draw ||align=left| Tetsuya Sakiyama || WKA || Hong Kong || Decision || 5 || 3:00

|-  style="background:#cfc;"
| 1981- || Win ||align=left| Posai Sitiboonlert||  || Phrae province, Thailand || Decision ||5 ||3:00

|-  style="background:#cfc;"
| 1981- || Win ||align=left| Petchsiam ||   || Bangkok, Thailand || TKO || 3 || 

|-  style="background:#cfc;"
| 1981- || Win ||align=left| Lakchart Sor.Prasatporn||  || Thailand || TKO || 5 || 

|-  style="background:#cfc;"
| 1981- || Win ||align=left| Densiam Hor.Mahachai ||  || Bangkok, Thailand || TKO (arm injury/Kicks) || 5 || 

|-  style="background:#fbb;"
| 1980-11-27 || Loss ||align=left| Yousop Sor.Thanikul ||  || Bangkok, Thailand || Decision || 5 || 3:00

|-  style="background:#fbb;"
| 1980- || Loss ||align=left| Lakchart Sor.Prasatporn||  ||Bangkok, Thailand || Decision || 5 || 3:00

|-  style="background:#fbb;"
| 1980-07-03 || Loss ||align=left| Tawanook Penmongkol|| Rajadamnern Stadium ||Bangkok, Thailand || Decision || 5 || 3:00

|-  style="background:#cfc;"
| 1980- || Win ||align=left| Siprae Kiatsompop ||  || Bangkok, Thailand || Decision || 5 || 3:00

|-  style="background:#c5d2ea;"
| 1980-04-28 || Draw ||align=left| Seksan Sor.Thepittak || Rajadamnern Stadium || Bangkok, Thailand || Decision || 5 || 3:00

|-  style="background:#cfc;"
| 1980-04-09 || Win ||align=left| Isamu Ozaki || Rajadamnern Stadium || Bangkok, Thailand || TKO (Knees to the body)|| 2||

|-  style="background:#fbb;"
| 1980-03-05 || Loss ||align=left| Yousop Sor.Thanikul || Rajadamnern Stadium || Bangkok, Thailand || KO (Elbow)|| 3 || 

|-  style="background:#cfc;"
| 1980-01-22 || Win ||align=left| Sagat Petchyindee || Lumpinee Stadium || Bangkok, Thailand || Decision || 5 || 3:00

|-  style="background:#cfc;"
| 1979-10-09 || Win ||align=left| Banrainoi Fairtex || Lumpinee Stadium || Bangkok, Thailand || Decision || 5 ||3:00

|-  style="background:#cfc;"
| 1979-08-31 || Win ||align=left| Pudpadnoi Worawut ||  || Bangkok, Thailand || Decision || 5 ||3:00

|-  style="background:#fbb;"
| 1978-12-29 || Loss||align=left| Kraikorn Singchakrawat || Lumpinee Stadium || Bangkok, Thailand || Decision || 5 ||3:00

|-
| colspan=9 | Legend:

See more
List of Muay Thai practitioners

References

1958 births
Living people
Payap Premchai
Payap Premchai